Intrigue (Spanish:Intriga) is a 1942 Spanish comedy mystery film directed by Antonio Román and starring Blanca de Silos and Manolo Morán.

Cast
 Mary Cruz
 Blanca de Silos
 Miguel del Castillo
 Ramón Elías
 Mariana Larrabeiti
 Manolo Morán as Inspector Ferrer 
 Guadalupe Muñoz Sampedro
 Julio Peña as Roberto Téllez 
 José Portes

References

Bibliography
 Bentley, Bernard. A Companion to Spanish Cinema. Boydell & Brewer 2008.

External links 

1942 films
1942 mystery films
Spanish mystery films
1940s Spanish-language films
Films directed by Antonio Román
Spanish black-and-white films
1940s Spanish films